Spirolina is a genus of foraminifera in the family Peneroplidae.

References

External links 
 

 
 Spirolina at the World Register of Marine Species (WoRMS)

Tubothalamea
Foraminifera genera